USS LST-466 was a United States Navy  used in the Asiatic-Pacific Theater during World War II. As with many of her class, the ship was never named. Instead, she was referred to by her hull designation.

Construction
The ship was laid down on 17 December 1942, under Maritime Commission (MARCOM) contract, MC hull 986, by  Kaiser Shipyards, Vancouver, Washington; launched 18 November 1942; and commissioned on 1 March 1943.

Service history
During World War II, LST-466 was assigned to the Asiatic-Pacific theater. She took part in the Eastern New Guinea operation, the Lae occupation in September 1943, the Saidor occupation in January 1944; the Bismarck Archipelago operation, the Cape Gloucester, New Britain, landings from December 1943 through February 1944, and the Admiralty Islands landings in February and March 1944; Hollandia operation in April and May 1944; the Western New Guinea operations, the Toem-Wakde-Sarmi area operation in May 1944, the Biak Islands operation in May and June 1944, the Noemfoor Island operation in July 1944, and the Cape Sansapor operation in July and August 1944; the Leyte operation in October 1944; the Lingayen Gulf landings in January 1945; and the Borneo operations, the Tarakan Island operation in April and May 1945, and the Balikpapan operation in June and July 1945.

Following the war, LST-466 performed occupation duty in the Far East in October 1945, and saw service in China in November and December 1945. Upon her return to the United States, the tank landing ship was decommissioned on 8 March 1946, and struck from the Navy list on 12 April, that same year. On 4 June 1948, she was sold to Hughes Bros., Inc., of New York City, and subsequently scrapped.

Honors and awards
LST-466 earned seven battle stars for her World War II service.

Notes 

Citations

Bibliography 

Online resources

External links

 

1942 ships
World War II amphibious warfare vessels of the United States
LST-1-class tank landing ships of the United States Navy
S3-M2-K2 ships
Ships built in Vancouver, Washington